New Genesis is a fictional planet appearing in American comic books published by DC Comics. A part of Jack Kirby's Fourth World mythos, the planet is home to the heroic New Gods led by the sage Highfather. New Genesis is the positive counterpart of Apokolips, home of the evil New Gods led by the tyrant Darkseid.

New Genesis is an unspoiled and sunlit world of forests, mountains, and bodies of water. The New Gods inhabit Supertown, a golden city floating above the planet's surface. Both New Genesis and Apokolips exist in a different plane of existence from the regular DC Universe, located near the Source that originated the Old and New Gods.

Accessing either Apokolips or New Genesis usually requires a form of travel known as "Boom Tube", a portal generated by a device known as Mother Box. In some versions, the boom tube actually converts the size of individuals that pass through to proportions fitting the destination, i.e., when a New God passes from Apokolips (or New Genesis) to Earth, they shrink in size, while someone going the other way would grow larger. If someone somehow reaches the Fourth World by other means, they will discover that its denizens are giants.

Fictional history

New Genesis and its dark counterpart Apokolips were spawned by the destruction of Urgrund, the world of the "Old Gods" (implied to be the gods of Norse mythology). New Genesis was given strength and nobility from the "living atoms" of the Old God Balduur, while Apokolips was saturated with evil from an unnamed sorceress. Through Darkseid's manipulation, the two planets entered a devastating war that only ended when the New Genesis general Izaya forsook the ways of war, contacted the Source and became the Highfather, agreeing to a pact with his enemy to secure peace. Eventually the pact was broken and the war restarted when Darkseid kidnapped people of Earth and Highfather directed warriors of New Genesis to oppose him.

The conflict between the two planets symbolizes the struggle of good and evil on a grand mythic scale. However, despiste unambiguously representing good, New Genesis and its inhabitants are not entirely perfect. Biographer Charles Hatfield writes, "The saga turns out to be not so simple, for Kirby — and this is revealing – blurs the seeming idealized perfection of New Genesis, adding complexity to his gods." Similarly, John Morrow writes, "Kirby knew that his New Genesis was no heaven. Rather, it was more like the free West during the Cold War, which was threatened by forces from within as well as without."

Highfather is a spiritual leader who maintains his people's connection to the primal energy field known as The Source. The original Highfather, Izaya the Inheritor, has since perished and been replaced by Earthling superhero Takion, a living conduit of The Source. In contrast to the industrial wasteland of Apokolips, New Genesis is a veritable paradise covered in lush forests and grasslands. The only urban location is Supertown, a floating city designed not to affect the planet's surface.

Seven Soldiers

Both Apokolips and New Genesis were seemingly destroyed in a final conflict, similar to that which destroyed Urgrund, home of the Old Gods prior to Grant Morrison's Seven Soldiers: Mister Miracle mini-series. However, the final issue of that series implied that the story's earlier events were merely visions seen by the hero as part of an elaborate test by the New God Metron. It seems that none of these events actually occurred, as the miniseries Death of the New Gods takes place on New Genesis and Apokolips in the first issue, and many of the new gods and other Fourth World characters are seen in their standard style throughout much of Countdown, Countdown to Mystery, and Superman/Batman. In addition to New Genesis and Apokolips still being in existence and the characters being portrayed as they have always been, there is no mention of any of the Seven Soldiers events.

It has since been revealed that Seven Soldiers is indeed part of established history, as its characters reappear in the Final Crisis and its events are referenced. It transpires that when Darkseid died (when, and how, a subject of some controversy in itself) he fell back through time. He, and many of the other New Gods, then incarnated in pre-existing human bodies. Most, if not all of these perished during Final Crisis, releasing their godly essence.

Death of the New Gods

At the end of the Death of the New Gods mini-series, with all the gods now dead, the Source entity merges Apokolips and New Genesis into a single planet and indicates that it will possibly be repopulated.

Final Crisis
At the end of this story, in issue #7, the New Gods of Supertown were reborn on Apokolips, itself reborn as New Genesis.

The New 52
In "The New 52", a reboot of the DC Comics universe, New Genesis is largely the same, though the surface of New Genesis is now littered with the ruins of New Genesis' previous cities on the surface of the planet, devastated by the New Genesis/Apokolips War.

Inhabitants

There are two types of inhabitants of New Genesis. The first are called the "gods" or "New Gods" (the upper class), a race of powerful immortals. The gods live in Supertown. The "Bug" (the lower class) evolved from "micro-life" spread on the planet's surface during the gods' war. They live on the planet's surface, in hives or the "Bug Mound". There is occasionally prejudice between these two races, as many of the gods consider the bug-people to be a lesser species.

Besides the New Gods and the Bugs of New Genesis, there also a race of indigenous peoples called Primitives that live in the forests of New Genesis.

Geography
There are different locations on New Genesis:

 Asylum of the Gods - An insane asylum on New Genesis where New Gods who have gone mad are incarcerated.
 Bug Mound - The home of the Bugs of New Genesis.
 Lonar's Range - An area of wilderness where the Primitives live.
 Singularity Stockade - A multiversal prison that is often used by the New Gods of New Genesis.
 Supertown - Also known as the Celestial City, Supertown is a floating city which is the capital of New Genesis and the home of its New Gods.

Travel
As it exists in a parallel dimension, travel between New Genesis and other worlds is only possible via technology known as the boom tube, dimensional gateways whose creation is signified by a sonic boom. It has been said that in their world, the gods of New Genesis are of gigantic stature and that travel through the boom tubes rescales them to mortal proportions.

In other media

Television
 New Genesis was featured in the Justice League episode "Twilight".
 New Genesis was referenced in the Young Justice episode "Disordered".

Video games
 New Genesis is featured in DC Universe Online as an open-world area to complete missions with or against Bugs or Parademons, while also having to defeat iconic enemies such as Lightray, Orion for heroes and Steppenwolf and Kalibak for villains.

References

External links
 Cosmic Teams: New Gods
 Index to the Earth-1 Fourth World stories
 DCU Guide: Old Gods

1971 in comics
Fourth World (comics)
DC Comics dimensions
DC Comics planets
Ecumenopolises
Fictional elements introduced in 1971